These are the official results of the Women's Heptathlon competition at the 1993 World Championships in Stuttgart, Germany. There were a total number of 34 participating athletes, including ten non-finishers. The competition started on Monday August 16, 1993, and ended on Tuesday August 17, 1993.

Medalists

Schedule

Monday, August 16, 1993

Tuesday, August 17, 1993

Records

Results

See also
 1992 Women's Olympic Heptathlon
 1993 Hypo-Meeting
 1994 Women's European Championships Heptathlon

References
 Results
 IAAF Statistics Handbook Daegu 2011, Part 3 of 5, Page 264

H
Heptathlon at the World Athletics Championships
1993 in women's athletics